The rugby sevens tournament at the 2018 Summer Youth Olympics was held from 13 to 15 October in Buenos Aires, Argentina.

12 rugby sevens teams, total 144 athletes, participated in the tournament. The rugby sevens competition took place at Club Atlético de San Isidro in San Isidro.

Qualification
Each National Olympic Committee (NOC) is limited to participation in 1 team sports (Futsal, Beach handball, Field Hockey, and Rugby Sevens) per each gender with the exception of the host country who can enter one team per sport. Also at rugby sevens each NOC can enter a maximum of 1 team of 12 athletes per both genders. To be eligible to participate in the Youth Olympics, athletes must have been born between 1 January 2000 and 31 December 2001. 

As hosts, Argentina has the right to directly qualify 1 team per both genders on account of Sudamérica Rugby quota. The best ranked NOC in each of the 5 Continental Qualification Tournaments will obtain quota place.

1 quota for boys' event given to host country, the member of Sudamérica Rugby.
1 quota for girls' event given to Sudamérica Rugby.
1 quota per each gender are given to Rugby Africa, Asia Rugby, Rugby Europe, Rugby Americas North, Oceania Rugby

Boys' qualification

 Canada and Australia won their respective tournaments, but through team sports quotas are sending their boys' field hockey teams instead. As such, the United States and Samoa qualify in their place as respective runners-up.

Girls' qualification

 Japan won the Asian championships, but through team sports quotas is sending its girls' futsal team instead. Kazakhstan is the next best ranked team without a team qualified for girls.

Medal summary

Medal table

Medalists

References

External links
Official Results Book – Rugby sevens

 
Rugby sevens
Summer Youth Olympics
Oly
2018
Olympic